Manduri is a municipality (município) in the state of São Paulo in Brazil. The population is 9,910 (2020 est.) in an area of 229 km². The elevation is 710 m.

Pictures

References

Municipalities in São Paulo (state)